N. Sakthan (born 5 May 1951) is an Indian politician who was Speaker of the Kerala Legislative Assembly from 2015 to 2016. He was also the Member of the Legislative Assembly (MLA) from Kattakada, Thiruvananthapuram, from 2011 to 2016.

Personal life
Sakthan was born to Nalla Thampi and Y. Thankamma. He was born at Kanjiramkulam in the erstwhile State of Travancore–Cochin on 5 May 1951. He has completed Master of Arts (M.A) and Bachelor of Laws (L.L.B) degree. He married Smt. Stella and they have two daughters. Elder daughter's name is Tintu, Younger daughter is Dr. Tisha.

Political career
N. Sakthan entered politics through Kerala Students Congress, the students wing of Kerala Congress. He was the treasurer of Trivandrum District Congress Committee (D.C.C) during 1987–1993, DCC General Secretary during 1993–2000, Member, District Council during 1991–1994. Sakthan is a member of Kerala Pradesh Congress Committee (K.P.C.C) executive and All India Congress Committee (AICC) from 2005.

Sakthan was elected to the Kerala Legislative Assembly as an Independent candidate in 1982 (Kovalam). Later he represented the Indian National Congress party and was re-elected to the assembly in 2001 and 2006 (Nemom) and in 2011 (Kattakada). In 2011, he first served as the pro-tem Speaker of the Assembly, and later was elected Deputy Speaker. When G. Karthikeyan, the speaker of Kerala Legislative Assembly died in office, Sakthan was elected to the post of Speaker, thus becoming the first person to serve in the posts of Pro tem Speaker, Deputy Speaker and Speaker, that too in a single assembly period. In 2016, he again contested from Kattakada, but then, he was defeated by I. B. Satheesh, a new contestant from CPI (M), by a margin of votes.

Sakthan served as Minister for Transport in the Government of Kerala under Chief Minister Oommen Chandy from 2004 to 2006.

References

1951 births
Living people
Malayali politicians
Indian National Congress politicians from Kerala
Politicians from Thiruvananthapuram
Deputy Speakers of the Kerala Legislative Assembly
Speakers of the Kerala Legislative Assembly
Kerala MLAs 1982–1987
Kerala MLAs 2011–2016
Government Law College, Thiruvananthapuram alumni